"Too Many People" is a song by Paul McCartney from his and his wife Linda McCartney's 1971 album Ram. It was issued as well as the B-side of the "Uncle Albert/Admiral Halsey" single. It was also included on The 7" Singles Box in 2022.

Background

"Too Many People" contains digs at McCartney's former bandmate and songwriting partner John Lennon, as well as his wife Yoko Ono. According to Ultimate Classic Rock critic Michael Gallucci, it is "McCartney's bitchiest kissoff to his ex-bandmates." As McCartney himself recalled in an interview with Playboy in 1984:

The song begins with the line "piece of cake" (similar in sound to "piss off, cake") later revealed to be a veiled jibe at Lennon:

The line "You took your lucky break and broke it in two" was originally "Yoko took your lucky break and broke it in two" but McCartney revised it before recording the song.  Despite this revision, Gallucci interprets the line as a "dig at Lennon's relationship with Yoko Ono."

Rolling Stone stated that "Too Many People"'s "incredibly sweet melody is proof that McCartney could use his charm as a weapon when he wanted to."

The introduction to the song as well as the bridge alternate the tonic chord of G major with its minor subdominant chord of C minor.  This allows McCartney to go from the bridge to a repetition of the introduction music as a means of moving the music back to the verses. According to Vincent Perez Benitez, this strategy "enhance[s] the coherence of the song," in a manner consistent with McCartney's earlier song "Maybe I'm Amazed." "Too Many People" incorporates guitar solos in both the middle and at the end of the song.

McCartney also recorded an instrumental version of "Too Many People" that was released on his Thrillington album.  In this version a stereo phaser was used to produce a sound that music journalist Ian Peel describes as coming from a "psychedelic echo chamber."

Recording
"Too Many People" was initially recorded on 10 November 1970 in Columbia Studios in New York City. Most of the overdubbing, including adding brass instruments to the beginning of the song, occurred in January 1971. Additional overdubbing occurred in March/April 1971.

Aftermath
Following the release of Ram, John Lennon pointed out several songs that he claimed were attacks at him, among them being "Too Many People".

In response, Lennon wrote "How Do You Sleep?" for his album Imagine, an attack at McCartney featuring musical contributions from George Harrison. McCartney later wrote "Dear Friend", a truce offering to Lennon, and released it on the album Wild Life with his band, Wings.

Reception
Rolling Stone rated "Too Many People" to be McCartney's 3rd greatest post-Beatles song, 2 slots ahead of its A-side "Uncle Albert/Admiral Halsey" and behind only "Band on the Run" and "Maybe I'm Amazed." Billboard described "Too Many People" as "wailing sentimentality." Capital Journal critic Steve Gettinger called "Too Many People" a high point of Ram stating that it is "bright and bitter, carefully constructed" and "unmistakably Beatles." Boston Globe critic Ernie Santosuosso described it as "a loud meditation about society" with a "particularly violent guitar statement," praising the music more than the lyrics.

Los Angeles Times critic Robert Hilburn described "Too Many People" as "a sort of musical extension of Thomas Malthus that includes some of the humorous irony of the vintage Beatles," with lines such as "Too many reaching for a piece of cake" and "Too many hungry people losing weight." Hilburn goes on to state that the song provides a lyric surprise, which he likens to an O. Henry story, in which the lyrics turn to "a statement about the resolution of ones problems in a difficult self-centered world." Hilburn suggests that this may be a reference to McCartney's experience with the Beatles' breakup.

According to Ultimate Classic Rock critic Nick DeRiso, the song's "haughty sermonizing" towards Lennon is one of the weaknesses of the Ram album.  But fellow Ultimate Classic Rock critic Gallucci rated the song as the 4th best Beatles' post-breakup fight song.

Of the instrumental version on Thrillington, Peel states that "rock 'n' roll is transformed into funky jazz with more than a hint of studio experimentation."

Personnel
Paul McCartney – vocals, acoustic guitar, electric guitar, bass guitar
Linda McCartney – backing vocals
Hugh McCracken – acoustic guitar, electric guitar
Denny Seiwell – drums, percussion

References

1970 songs
Paul McCartney songs
Songs written by Paul McCartney
Song recordings produced by Paul McCartney
Music published by MPL Music Publishing
Songs about John Lennon
Songs about Yoko Ono
Diss tracks
Apple Records singles